Helmiopsiella is a genus of flowering plants belonging to the family Malvaceae.

It is native to Madagascar.

The genus name of Helmiopsiella is in honour of C. Helm, German clergyman in Berlin and  amateur botanist. It was first described and published in Bull. Mus. Natl. Hist. Nat., séries 2, Vol.28 on page 150 in 1956.

Known species, according to Kew:
Helmiopsiella ctenostegia 
Helmiopsiella leandrii 
Helmiopsiella madagascariensis 
Helmiopsiella poissonii

References

Dombeyoideae
Malvaceae genera
Endemic flora of Madagascar
Plants described in 1956